Harold E. Treadwell (April 21, 1897 – January 1, 1971) was an American baseball pitcher in the Negro leagues. He played from 1919 to 1928 with several teams.

References

External links
 and Baseball-Reference Black Baseball stats and Seamheads

1897 births
1971 deaths
Bacharach Giants players
Chicago American Giants players
Cleveland Browns (baseball) players
Dayton Marcos players
Detroit Stars players
Indianapolis ABCs players
Lincoln Giants players
Baseball players from North Carolina
20th-century African-American sportspeople
Baseball pitchers